Asociația Club Sportiv ARO Muscelul Câmpulung, commonly known as Muscelul Câmpulung, is a Romanian professional football club based in Câmpulung, Argeș County and currently playing in the Liga IV – Argeș County, the fourth tier of the Romanian football league system. 

The club has known glory during the communist era when, under the ownership of ARO, played constantly at the level of second or third league. The collapse of the off-road cars manufacturer has seriously affected the team which went bankrupt in the early 2000s. After the bankruptcy of ARO in 2003, the club was refounded several times, firstly in 2007 as Sporting Câmpulung, then in 2012 as CN Dinicu Golescu (named after the high school from the town), but at its best, the team played in the Liga III, but was dissolved again in 2016. In the summer of 2019, after three years of inactivity, the club was refounded again, this time as Academia de Fotbal Muscelul Câmpulung.

History
The club was founded in 1947 as Muscelul Câmpulung and played for sixteen years in the Regional Championship. Muscelul, coached by Jean Lăpușneanu, promoted in Divizia C at the end of the 1962–63 season after finishing as runners-up in the Argeș Regional Championship.

Muscelul finished last in the 1963–64 season, spared from relegation due de the expansion of the Third Division. Followed three more seasons in the third tier of Romanian football in which was ranked ninth in 1964–65 season, eleventh in 1965–66 and thirteenth in 1966–67, thus relegating in the Regional Championship. 

Muscelul finished second in the 1967–68 season of the Argeș Regional Championship and promoted to Divizia C. After finished eleventh in 1968–69 season in the Third Division, the club was renamed as Unirea Câmpulung for 1969–70 season, but relegated after was ranked fifteen in the 4th series.

Following relegation, the club reverted to Muscelul name went on to won the 1970–71 Argeș County Championship made a quick comeback to Divizia C. Their stay in Third Division was short-lived, as  immediately relegated back to the County Championship after finished thirteenth at the end of the 1971–72 season.

In the summer of 2019, after three years of inactivity, the club was refounded again, this time as Academia de Fotbal Muscelul Câmpulung, former Romanian international Gheorghe Mihali was named as manager and Roberto Ayza was one of the first transfers realized by the new entity followed by Iulian Tameș and Iulian Vladu among others. However, the 2019–20 season was suspended in March 2020, due to COVID-19 pandemic in Romania with Muscelul finishing in third place.

In the summer of 2020, it was renamed as Inter Câmpulung and finished the 2020–21 short season third in Group B of  the Liga IV Argeș County. In the next season, Muscelenii fought for promotion, finishing in second place one point behind CS Rucăr.

In 2022, the club was renamed again, this time as ARO Muscelul Câmpulung.

Honours
Liga III
Winners (2): 1976–77, 1984–85
Runners-up (4): 1981–82, 1983–84, 1986–87, 1994–95

Liga IV – Argeș County
Winners (5): 1970–71, 1972–73, 1992–93, 1993–94, 2013–14
Runners-up (1): 2021–22

Argeș Regional Championship
Winners (1): 1960–61
Runners-up (2): 1962–63, 1967–68

Players

First team squad

Club officials

Board of directors

Current technical staff

League history

References

External links

Football clubs in Argeș County
Association football clubs established in 1947
Liga II clubs
Liga III clubs
Liga IV clubs
1947 establishments in Romania
Câmpulung